Woodhead may refer to:

Places
Burley Woodhead, hamlet in Bradford, England 
Woodhead, Aberdeenshire, settlement in Scotland 
Woodhead Dam, South Africa 
Woodhead, Derbyshire, settlement in England, near to:
Woodhead Reservoir, artificial lake
Woodhead, Hamilton, Scotland, neighbourhood in South Lanarkshire 
Woodhead Line, railway line in the north of England, featuring:
Woodhead railway station
Woodhead Tunnel

Other uses
Woodhead (surname)
Woodhead Commission, a 1938 commission on the future of Palestine
Woodhead Publishing, an international publishing company
A628 road, part of which is the Woodhead Pass over the Pennines